Kochummania is a genus of thrips in the family Phlaeothripidae.

Species
 Kochummania excelsa

References

Phlaeothripidae
Thrips genera